Cotoneaster obovatus is a species of flowering plant in the family Rosaceae that can be found in Kangra and northeastern Punjab provinces of India.

Description

References

obovatus
Flora of West Himalaya